The Narrow Road is a 1912 short silent film directed by D. W. Griffith and produced and distributed by the Biograph Company.

A short Biograph film preserved from the Library of Congress paperprint collection.

Cast
Elmer Booth - Jim Holcomb
Mary Pickford - Mrs. Jim Holcomb
Charles Hill Mailes - The Counterfeiter
Jack Pickford -

other cast
W. Christy Cabanne - A Tramp
Max Davidson - A Tramp
Frank Evans - A Prison Guard
Charles Gorman - A Detective
Grace Henderson - 
Harry Hyde -
J. Jiquel Lanoe - A Prisoner/The Foreman
Adolph Lestina - A Bartender
Alfred Paget - A Detective
W. C. Robinson - A Prison Guard

References

External links
 The Narrow Road at IMDb.com

 The Narrow Road available for free download at Internet Archive

1912 films
Silent American drama films
American silent short films
Biograph Company films
Films directed by D. W. Griffith
1912 short films
1912 drama films
American black-and-white films
1910s American films